Inger is a Scandinavian given name, male and feminine, originally short for a name in Ing-, either
Ingrid or Ingegerd. 

 Inger Ottesdotter Rømer (c. 1475–1555), Norwegian landowner and political intriguer
 Aud Inger Aure (born 1942), Norwegian politician
 Inger Ash Wolfe (21st century), Canadian writer
 Inger Aufles (born 1941), Norwegian cross-country skier
 Inger Berggren (born 1934), Swedish singer
 Inger Bjørnbakken (born 1933), Norwegian alpine skier
 Inger Brattström (1920–2018), Swedish writer
 Inger Christensen (1935–2009), Danish poet
 Inger Davidson (born 1944), Swedish politician
 Inger Edelfeldt (born 1965), Swedish author
 Inger Frimansson (born 1944), Swedish novelist
 Inger Hagerup (1905–1985), Norwegian author
 Inger Haldorsen (1899–1982), Norwegian physician, midwife and politician
 Inger Helene Nybråten (born 1960), Norwegian cross-country skier
 Inger Koppernæs (1928–1990), Norwegian politician
 Inger Lise Gjørv (1938–2009), Norwegian politician
 Inger Lise Rypdal (born 1949), Norwegian singer and actress
 Inger Løite (born 1958), Norwegian politician
 Inger Lorre (born 1964), American singer
 Inger Louise Valle (1921–2006), Norwegian politician
 Inger Lundberg (1948–2006), Swedish politician
 Inger Margrethe Boberg (1900–1957), Danish folklore researcher
 Inger Miller (born 1972), American sprinter
 Inger Nilsson (born 1959), Swedish actress
 Inger Nordlander (born 1938), Swedish politician
 Inger Pedersen (born 1936), Norwegian politician
 Inger René (born 1937), Swedish politician
 Inger S. Enger (born 1948), Norwegian politician
 Inger Sandberg, Swedish author of children's books
 Inger Segelström (born 1952), Swedish politician
 Inger Stender (1912–1989), Danish actress
 Inger Stevens (1934–1970), Swedish-American actress
 Inger Støjberg (born 1973), Danish politician

See also
 Inger-Lise Skarstein (born 1937), Norwegian politician
 Inger-Marie Ytterhorn (1941–2021), Norwegian politician

Scandinavian feminine given names
Danish feminine given names
Norwegian feminine given names
Swedish feminine given names